Ricardo Sanabria Acuña (born 31 October 1969) is a former Paraguay international footballer who played as a defender. He played professional football in Paraguay, Argentina, Brazil and Spain during his career.

Sanabria obtained his only cap for the Paraguay national football team on 15 August 1993 in a World Cup qualifying match against Peru (2-1 win), substituting Luis Alberto Monzón in the 83rd minute. He represented Paraguay at the 1992 Summer Olympics in Barcelona, Spain.

References

1969 births
Living people
Paraguayan footballers
Paraguay international footballers
Paraguayan expatriate footballers
Association football central defenders
Footballers at the 1992 Summer Olympics
Olympic footballers of Paraguay
Expatriate footballers in Argentina
Expatriate footballers in Spain
People from San Lorenzo, Paraguay